Uhrovské Podhradie is a village and municipality in Bánovce nad Bebravou District in the Trenčín Region of north-western Slovakia. The village is situated close to the ruins of a Roman castle Uhrovec.

History
In historical records the village was first mentioned in 1481.

Geography
The municipality lies at an altitude of 340 metres and covers an area of 12.522 km2. It has a population of about 46 people.

External links
http://www.statistics.sk/mosmis/eng/run.html

Villages and municipalities in Bánovce nad Bebravou District